Alfredo Solf y Muro (15 March 1872, in Lambayeque – 14 August 1969, in Lima) was a Peruvian politician. He was Minister of Finance in 1933. He was the Prime Minister of Peru from 8 December 1939 until 3 December 1944. Solf y Muro also served as foreign minister.

He died on 14 August 1969, aged 97.

References 

1872 births
1969 deaths
People from Lambayeque Region
Prime Ministers of Peru
Peruvian Ministers of Economy and Finance
Foreign ministers of Peru